Ostap Ihorovych Shapaylo (Ukrainina: Остап Ігорович Шипайло; born January 7, 1989, in Lviv) is a Ukrainian lawyer and entrepreneur. People's Deputy of Ukraine of the 9th convocation.

Biography 
He graduated from the Faculty of Geography of Ivan Franko Lviv National University (specialty "Management of Organizations"), the Institute of Postgraduate Education and Pre-University Training of Ivan Franko National University of Lviv (specialty "Legal Regulation of Public Administration and Local Self-Government").

Ostap Shipaylo is a director of Karpatbud Development LLC and a subsidiary of Lviv Energy.

He has held senior positions in various companies.

Political activity 
Candidate for People's Deputies from the Servant of the People party in the 2019 parliamentary elections, № 120 on the list. At the time of the election: director of Karpatbud Development LLC, non-partisan. Lives in Lviv.

Member of the Verkhovna Rada Committee on Energy and Housing and Communal Services, Chairman of the Subcommittee on Nuclear Energy and Nuclear Safety.

Reference 

Living people
1989 births
Businesspeople from Lviv
Lawyers from Lviv